Volcán de Agua (also known as Hunahpú by Maya) is a stratovolcano located in the departments of Sacatepéquez and Escuintla in Guatemala. It dominates the local landscape except when hidden by cloud cover. The volcano is within  of the city of Antigua Guatemala and several other large towns situated on its northern apron. These towns have a combined population of nearly 100,000. Coffee is grown on the volcano's lower slopes.

Brief description and history

The local Kaqchikel people have always called the volcano Hunapú "place of flowers" or Jun Ajpu' "one hunter" (The calendar date for the sacred site; a typical method for naming sacred sites in Mayan cosmovision) in current Kaqchikel orthography. The Spanish conquistadors also called it Hunapú until a lahar from the volcano on September 10, 1541 destroyed the original capital of Guatemala (now known as Ciudad Vieja) and the city was moved to Antigua Guatemala following this disaster. Among the casualties was the governor Beatriz de la Cueva. As the lahar produced a destructive flood of water, this prompted the modern name "Volcán de Agua" meaning "Volcano of Water", in contrast to the nearby "Volcán de Fuego" or "Volcano of Fire". The Kaqchikels call Volcan de Fuego Chi Gag, which translates to "where the fire is" or Chi Q'aq' in current Kaqchikel orthography.

The volcano was active in the late Pleistocene between 80,000 and 10,000 years ago, but has not erupted since then. Despite the lack of eruptive activity, the volcano can still produce debris flows and lahars that inundate nearby populated areas. This was proven by the fact that on 11 September 1541, newly founded villa of Santiago de los Caballeros was ruined by a "formidable landslide that came down Volcán de Agua; the mudslide brought along heavy rocks that destroyed part of the buildings and damaged the rest". The city was destroyed and the survivors had no direction, since governor Beatriz de la Cueva died during the disaster, which took place shortly after her husband, Adelantado Pedro de Alvarado, died and she was appointed governor by the Ayuntamiento (English:City Hall). Beatriz de la Cueva had been beside herself with grief and on 9 September 1541, when she had signed the Cabildo documents, she did so as "la sin ventura" (English: the hapless one), a phrase that turned out to be prophetic. In the aftermath Beatriz de la Cueva was blamed for the disaster as it was considered to be a godly punishment for her sins. Additionally her fate became a cautionary tale about giving women positions in government particularly when many qualified men were available.

In 1895 Anne Cary Maudslay and her husband, archeologist Alfred Percival Maudslay visited the Antigua Guatemala region as part of a journey through Guatemala's Maya and colonial archeological monuments, and climbed the Volcán de Agua; she wrote a book called A Glimpse at Guatemala where she explains that water from the volcano crater could not have destroyed the old Santiago: The cause of this catastrophe is usually said to have been the bursting of the side of a lake which had been formed in the crater of the extinct Volcán de Agua; but an examination of the crater shows this explanation to be improbable, as the break in the crater-wall is in an opposite direction, and no water flowing from it could have reached the town. Moreover, there is no evidence to show that the deeper portion of the crater, which is still intact, has held water since the reported outbreak. Indeed, an accumulation of water during the exceptionally heavy rain, through some temporary obstruction in one of the deep worn gullies which indent the beautiful slope of that great mountain, and a subsequent landslip would probably account for the damage done without the aid of either an eruption of water from the crater or the supernatural appearances which are duly noted by the old chroniclers.The volcano was last blanketed by snowfall in January 1967.

On 21 January 2012, 12,000 Guatemalans formed a human chain all the way to the peak Volcan de Agua in a protest against domestic violence.

Gallery

See also
 
 List of volcanoes in Guatemala
 Mountain peaks of North America
 List of stratovolcanoes

Notes and references

References

Bibliography

External links
 
  Ideal Pictures Corp. Menace of Guatemala (Ideal What-Nots series), 1934 documentary now in the public domain. Hosted at the Internet Archive. The narrator has a patronizing attitude to Guatemalans, but the footage is interesting.
 "Volcán de Agua, Guatemala" on Peakbagger

Mountains of Guatemala
Stratovolcanoes of Guatemala
Subduction volcanoes
Volcano
Sacatepéquez Department
Sierra Madre de Chiapas
Pleistocene stratovolcanoes